Pierre Louis Alfred Duprat was a governor in the early 20th century French Colonial Empire.

Titles held

See also 
 Colonial and Departmental Heads of Guadeloupe

References 

French colonial governors and administrators
Governors of French India
Governors of Réunion
Year of death missing
Year of birth missing